|}

The Brontë Cup Fillies' Stakes is a Group 3 flat horse race in Great Britain open to fillies and mares aged four years or older. It is run at York over a distance of 1 mile, 5 furlongs and 188 yards (2,787 metres), and is scheduled to take place each year in late May.

History
The Brontë Cup was introduced in 2018 as part of the European Pattern Committee's commitment to improving the race programme for stayers in Europe.

The race is named in honour of the Brontë sisters.

Winners

See also
 Horse racing in Great Britain
 List of British flat horse races

References

Racing Post:
 ifhaonline.org – International Federation of Horseracing Authorities – Bronte Cup (2019).

Flat races in Great Britain
York Racecourse
Long-distance horse races for fillies and mares
Recurring sporting events established in 2018
2018 establishments in England